Baldev Khosa is an Indian film actor turned   politician from Maharashtra. He is a four term Member of the Maharashtra Legislative Assembly. He lost his seat in the 2014 election. He is most remembered for his role as Sukha in Punjabi blockbuster movie Putt Jattan De (1983).

Family background and film career
Khosa originally hails from village Jhandeana in Moga district, Punjab.

Political career
He was a close confidante of late Sunil Dutt and entered politics with him for the first time when Dutt was elected to the Lok Sabha. Baldev Khosa was fielded from the then Amboli (Vidhan Sabha constituency) in Mumbai to fight the state Assembly elections in February 1985 and won. He didn't contest the next state election from Versova Constituency in 1991. In 1999, 2004 & 2009, he was consecutively elected to the Assembly. In 2014 & 2019, he lost the polls. He is a member of the Indian National Congress.

Filmography

Offices held 
Maharashtra Legislative Assembly MLA
Terms in office:1999-2004, 2004-2009 and  2009-2014.

References

External links 

Living people
Indian National Congress politicians
Maharashtra MLAs 1999–2004
Maharashtra MLAs 2004–2009
Maharashtra MLAs 2009–2014
Year of birth missing (living people)